Wing Commander Tyron D. S. Silvapulle, PWV, RWP, RWP (also referred to as Tyrone Silvapulle, born 22 July 1966 and died 17 December 1999) was a Sri Lankan pilot. He distinguished himself as a capable helicopter pilot in the Sri Lanka Air Force during the Sri Lankan Civil War. Silvapulle was killed in action in northern Sri Lanka, and posthumously awarded the Parama Weera Vibhushanaya, the country's highest military award for gallantry. To date, he is the only recipient of the award from the Sri Lanka Air Force.

Early life and military career
Silvapulle was a Sri Lankan Chetty and was educated at St. Joseph's College, Colombo. He was married at the time of his death, with his wife expecting a child.

Silvapulle joined in the air force on 18 May 1986, under the enlistment number 01502. He was part of the 16th pilot intake to the air force, and served as a pilot in both the northern and eastern fronts during the war. Silvapulle flew Bell 212 and Mil Mi-17 transport helicopters as a general duties pilot before being assigned to the No. 9 Attack Helicopter Squadron to pilot the air force's Mil Mi-24 gunships.

Action on 17 December 1999
On 17 December 1999, the army's forward defence lines at Thamilamadam near Elephant Pass came under attack from a group of Tamil Tiger boats. The Air Force dispatched two Mi-24 gunships to provide close air support for the troops at the defence lines. Silvapulle, a Squadron Leader at the time, led the formation piloting his Mi-24 with the identification numbers CH-618. Suspecting that the Tamil Tigers may be armed with surface-to-air missiles, he ordered his wingman to stay out of range and proceeded to attack the boats, repelling the attack and forcing them to retreat. Despite adverse weather conditions and the potential danger to his aircraft, Silvapulle continued to pursue the fleeing boats and attack them. However, his gunship was hit by a projectile, which the military later suspected was an anti-aircraft missile.

The damaged aircraft crashed into the Kilali lagoon, killing Silvapulle, his co-pilot Flying Officer Chinthaka Prashan De Soysa and two gunners. Their bodies were later retrieved in a joint operation by the air force and army. Some vital components of the gunship were salvaged, and the rest of the wreckage was demolished. This incident was the second time that a Mi-24 of the air force had been taken down by enemy fire.

Awards and recognition
Silvapulle received the Rana Wickrama Padakkama and the Rana Sura Padakkama, the fourth and fifth highest awards respectively for gallantry during combat, in 1994. He was also awarded a number of service and campaign medals. Silvapulle was promoted to the rank of Wing Commander after his death,  and recommended for the Parama Weera Vibhushanaya. It was approved more than 12 years later, after the end of the war. The decision to award the medal was announced in The Sri Lanka Gazette on 16 May 2012. The citation for his medal commends his actions on 17 December 1999 as follows:

His medal was awarded to his next-of-kin on 19 May 2012 by Mahinda Rajapaksa, the President of Sri Lanka, at the celebrations marking the third anniversary of the end of the war.  Silvapulle is the first and only recipient of the Parama Weera Vibhushanaya from the air force.

References 

Recipients of the Parama Weera Vibhushanaya
Sri Lankan Air Force officers
1999 deaths
Sri Lankan military personnel killed in action
1966 births
Sri Lankan Chetties
Sri Lankan Tamil military personnel